Poletown may refer to:

Places
Poletown East, Detroit, a neighborhood in Detroit, Michigan
Poletown, Virginia, a community in Wythe County

Other
Poletown (album), by Donnie Iris